Wilderville, Texas is an unincorporated community in Falls County, Texas. It is six miles southeast of Rosebud, located on FM 413. In 2000, the population was 45.

History
The area was first settled right after the American Civil War in the 1870s by the E. M. Wilder family, the namesake for the community. A post office operated in the town from 1874 to 1906. 300 residents lived in the town in the early parts of the 20th century, when Wilderville had two churches, a school, steam gristmills, cotton gins, and a weekly newspaper. However it soon went backfire as the population reached a mere 10 residents in 1930. By 2000, the population had risen to 45 again, but only one store called Wilderville home.

References

Unincorporated communities in Texas
Unincorporated communities in Falls County, Texas